Gaumul is the newly formed rural municipality in Bajura District in the Sudurpashchim Province of Nepal.  It was formed in March 2017, when Government of Nepal announced 744 local level units in line with the Constitution of Nepal 2015. It lies to the north west of Martadi.

History
It is formed by merging previous 2 VDCs named Dahakot and Manakot along with  ward no. 1 of Badimalika Municipality.

It is the second biggest rural municipality in terms of area and smallest on the basis population. It is divided into 6 wards and the headquarter  of this newly formed municipality is situated at Manakot. The name of this rural municipality is derived after the place called Gaumul which is the origin place of river Budhi Ganga River.

This rural municipality is famous for Potato and Allo production. It is also rich for medicinal herbs. Medicinal herbs such as Picrorhiza kurroa or कुटकी, Yarshagumba, Shilajit, Nardostachys jatamansi etc. are found here.

Demographics
At the time of the 2011 Nepal census, Gaumul Rural Municipality had a population of 8,515. Of these, 99.9% spoke Nepali and 0.1% other languages as their first language.

In terms of ethnicity/caste, 79.6% were Chhetri, 9.4% Kami, 5.6% Sarki, 3.7% Lohar, 1.5% Hill Brahmin and 0.2% others.

In terms of religion, 100.0% were Hindu.

References

Rural municipalities in Bajura District
Bajura District
Rural municipalities of Nepal established in 2017